Marcello Benvenuti (born 26 April 1964) is a retired Italian high jumper.

Biography
He became Italian high jump champion in 1989, rivalling with Luca Toso and Daniele Pagani. He also became indoor champion in 1989. His personal best jump is 2.33 metres, achieved in September 1989 in Verona. This was the Italian record.

National records
 High jump: 2.33 m,  Verona, 20 September 1989. Record held until 2 August 2015.

National titles
Marcello Benvenuti has won 3 times the individual national championship.

Italian Athletics Championships
High jump: 1989
Italian Athletics Indoor Championships
High jump: 1989, 1992

See also
Italian records in athletics
 Men's high jump Italian record progression
Italian all-time top lists - High jump

References

External links
 

1964 births
Living people
Italian male high jumpers
Athletics competitors of Centro Sportivo Carabinieri